Orna Grumberg (born April 30, 1952 in Hadera near Haifa) is an Israeli computer scientist and academic, the Leumi Chair of Science at the Technion.

Grumberg is noted for developing model checking, a method for formally verifying hardware and software designs. With Edmund M. Clarke and Doron A. Peled, she is the author of the book Model Checking (MIT Press, 1999).

In 2013 Grumberg was elected to the Academia Europaea. In 2015 she was named a Fellow of the Association for Computing Machinery "for contributions to research in automated formal verification of hardware and software systems."

References

1952 births
Living people
Israeli computer scientists
Israeli women computer scientists
Academic staff of Technion – Israel Institute of Technology
Members of Academia Europaea
Fellows of the Association for Computing Machinery
Place of birth missing (living people)